Las Cogotas is an archaeological site in Spain in Cardenosa municipality, province of Avila. The site was researched by the Galician archaeologist Juan Cabré in 1920s. It is namesake for two different archaeological cultures known from this site: Cogotas I (pre-Celtic) of the Late Bronze Age and Cogotas II (most probably Celtic) of the Iron Age. The latter is known from the upper layer of Las Cogotas, which represents a classical settlement of Vettones, which inhabited the territory of modern provinces of Avila and Salamanca, as well as parts of Toledo, Zamora, Caseres and Tras-os-Montes in Portugal.

Protocogotas culture 
This stage of the Meseta history is the least known, although a series of archeological sites, such as Los Tolmos de Caracena in Soria, Cogeces del Monte in Valladolid, Abia de la Obispalia in Cuenca, and some others, allow to describe Protocogotas culture as a formation stage of Cogotas I culture. This culture, which existed around 1700—1550 BC, is also known as Cogeces horizon, and is based on the Bell Beaker substrate influenced by either El Argar or Atlantic Bronze. Although Protocogotas culture was not represented by finds in La Cogotas, it did have characteristic traits later displayed in Cogotas I.

Cogotas I 
Characteristic for this culture is black pottery with incised geometric motives incrusted by white paste (:es:Cerámica de Boquique). Vessels were relatively small, flat-based, conic, rough, supposedly used as kitchen ware.
Chronology of Cogotas I:
 Formation stage, 1700 BC (Protocogotas)
 incised and Boquique ceramics, 1550 BC.
 trade networks, 1350 BC.
 expansion of the culture, 1100 BC.
 disappearance, 1000 BC.

Cogotas II 

In the early 1st millennium BC the Iberic peninsula was invaded by the Celts and other Indo-European tribes, which occupied the central and western parts of the peninsula and created new cultures on the ruins of the older ones. One of them were Vettones, most probably of Celtic origin. Characteristic for Cogotas II cultures are verraco statues. These are stone bovine statues situated on pasture lands, whose exact usage is still unclear.

Among other material culture objects there were daggers, flat axes, copper alloy axes, sickles, granite grindstones, spindle whorls etc.
Like other similar settlements, Cogotas of that time was divided into several functional districts, including several cattle enclosures and a necropolis. Cattle husbandry played an important role in the life of Vettones, which was probably reflected in their zoomorphic verraco statues.

Gallery

See also

Literature

 Historia de Castilla y León. 1. La prehistoria del Valle del Duero, Valladolid, 1985. G. Delibes.
 La Cultura de las Cogotas I, Actas del Homenaje a Luis Siret, Sevilla, 1986. Mª. D. Fernández Posse.

Archaeological sites in Castile and León
Prehistoric sites in Spain
Bronze Age sites in Europe
Iron Age sites in Spain
Cogotas
Cogotas
Celtic archaeological cultures
Bronze Age Spain
Iron Age cultures of Europe
Iron Age Spain